Ran Bahadur Singh was an Indian freedom fighter and politician. He represented Indian National Congress in 1957 Uttar Pradesh Legislative Assembly election and 1962 Uttar Pradesh Legislative Assembly election. Singh is the founder of several educational institutions in Harraiya. In 1947, He started National Inter College which is the first Senior Secondary School of Harraiya and one of the oldest in Basti district. He also founded Kisan Inter College Parashurampur, Harraiya.

Electoral history 
Singh entered into regional politics in 1957 Uttar Pradesh Legislative Assembly Election. He contested from Basti District, Harraiya (Assembly constituency). He was also a member of Provincial Congress Committee. He was two times MLA from Harraiya Constituency from 1957 to 1967. In 1967, Ran Bahadur Singh became the MLC from Basti Legislative Council.

References

1921 births
1983 deaths
Indian National Congress politicians from Uttar Pradesh